Platanthera psycodes, commonly called lesser purple fringed orchid or small purple-fringed orchid, is a species of orchid, genus Platanthera,  occurring from eastern Canada (from Manitoba to Newfoundland) to the east-central and northeastern United States (Great Lakes Region, Appalachian Mountains, and New England). It is imperiled in Illinois, Tennessee, North Carolina, and Kentucky.

The specific epithet psycodes is a misspelling of psychodes, which means "butterfly-like", probably alluding to the shape of the flowers. Like many other orchids it is a plant of wet habitats: sedge meadows, flatwoods, sphagnum bogs, cedar or alder swamps, on stream edges or the moist edges of coniferous forests. It is occasionally found in wet swales adjoining freshwater sandy beaches. Preferring cooler habitats, its range is being pushed northwards as global temperatures warm. Correll refers to locations of  altitudes in Vermont,  altitudes in Virginia and  altitudes in North Carolina and Tennessee. The most important characteristic separating the two species is the shape of the column and relative placement of the pollinia on the pollinators. In P. psycodes the column is shaped such that the pollinia are attached to the proboscis of the pollinator whereas in P. grandiflora the column is larger and the viscidia of the pollinia are widely spaced and outwardly rotated. This results in the pollinia being placed on the eyes of the pollinator. P. grandiflora has a much more restricted range and where the two species do overlap in range, they are phenotypically separated, with P. grandiflora typically blooming from late June through early July while P. psycodes blooms from late July through early August.

References

Correll, Donovan S.. Native Orchids of North America North of Mexico.  Waltham: Chronica Botanica Co.. 1950

External links 
 
 
 

psycodes
Orchids of Canada
Orchids of the United States
Orchids of Kentucky
Orchids of Maryland
Flora of Eastern Canada
Flora of the Northeastern United States
Flora of the North-Central United States
Flora of the Southeastern United States
Flora of the Appalachian Mountains
Flora of the Great Lakes region (North America)
Plants described in 1753
Taxa named by Carl Linnaeus